Hypotia perstrigata is a species of snout moth in the genus Hypotia. 

I it is known from Kenya and Somalia.

References

Hampson G. F. 1916a. In Poulton, E. B. On a collection of moths made in Somaliland by Mr. W. Feather. - Proceedings of the Zoological Society of London 1916(1):91–182, pls 1–2: 172–173; pl. 2, fig. 40.

Moths described in 1916
Hypotiini